A general election was held in the U.S. state of Minnesota on November 8, 2016. All seats in the Minnesota Senate and Minnesota House of Representatives were up for election as well as Minnesota's 10 presidential electors and Minnesota's eight seats in the United States House of Representatives. A primary election was held on August 9, 2016.

Voters also approved a proposed amendment to the Minnesota Constitution.

State elections

Minnesota Senate

All 67 seats in the Minnesota Senate were up for election. The Republican Party of Minnesota won a majority of 34 seats compared to the Minnesota Democratic–Farmer–Labor Party's (DFL) 33. Before the election, the DFL held a majority of 39 seats compared to the Republicans' 28.

Minnesota House of Representatives

All 134 seats in the Minnesota House of Representatives were up for election. The Republican Party of Minnesota won a majority of 76 seats compared to the Minnesota Democratic–Farmer–Labor Party's (DFL) 57. Before the election, the Republicans held a majority of 73 seats compared to the DFL's 61.

Judiciary
Minnesota Supreme Court justice Natalie Hudson won election to a six-year term following her appointment in 2015 by Governor Mark Dayton. Several seats on the Minnesota Court of Appeals and the Minnesota District Courts were also up for election.

Federal elections

President and vice president of the United States

Minnesota's 10 electors in the Electoral College were up for election, which was won by the Democratic nominees for president and vice president of the United States, Hillary Clinton and Tim Kaine. The electors voted on December 19, 2016.

United States House of Representatives

Minnesota's eight seats in the United States House of Representatives were up for election. The DFL held five seats compared to the Republicans' three before the election, which was unchanged by the election. Neither party gained or lost seats.

Ballot questions
A proposed amendment to the Minnesota Constitution to establish an independent council to set salaries for members of the Minnesota Legislature was approved by voters.

References

External links
 Elections & Voting - Minnesota Secretary of State

 
Minnesota